Cas Jansen (born Casper Jansen) is a Dutch actor born on 24 June 1977 in Badhoevedorp, the Netherlands. He voiced Emo in the short film Elephants Dream (2006).

He is also known for his appearances in the Dutch soap opera Goede tijden, slechte tijden.

Filmography
Too Fat Too Furious (Vet hard) (2005)
Elephants Dream (2006)
The Hell of '63 (2009)
Old Stars (2011)

References

External links

1977 births
Living people
Dutch male television actors
Dutch male voice actors
People from Haarlemmermeer
21st-century Dutch male actors